Monika Samtani is an American broadcast journalist. She is best known for directing a documentary movie Suma's Story: It's Her Turn (2015).

Career 

Samtani attended George Washington University and obtained a Bachelor of Arts in Radio and Television Communications. She was a fill-in disc jockey on Essex Radio/Breeze AM in 1989. She joined as a morning traffic anchor on WUSA9 in 1997. She appeared in the film An American Affair (2008).

Samtani founded LAUNCH Network from 2011 to 2013, a networking organization for women entrepreneurs. In 2014, she started her company Ms. Media, with a focus on helping businesses and non-profits market themselves, including Sahara Deepika Foundation for Education  In 2016, Samtani became a TEDx talker.

Awards and honors
 Maryland’s Achievement in Public Information Awards, 2002
Internet & Video Association (TIVA) D.C. Peer Awards, 2010
Featured on the cover of Washington FAMILY Magazine

References

External links
 

American women journalists
People from Ann Arbor, Michigan
Living people
Year of birth missing (living people)
Columbian College of Arts and Sciences alumni
American film directors